Vladimir Eduardovich Malyavin (born 4 March 1973 in Aşgabat, Turkmen SSR) is a retired male long jumper from Russia.

Career 
He originally represented Turkmenistan. He competed at the 1993 World Championships, the 1995 World Indoor Championships, the 1995 World Championships and the 1996 Olympic Games without reaching the final.

For Russia he finished twelfth at the 2000 Olympic Games, seventh at the 2001 World Indoor Championships and eighth at the 2002 European Championships. He competed at the 2008 Olympic Games without reaching the final.

His personal best jump is 8.25 metres, achieved in June 2000 in St. Petersburg.

References 
sports-reference

External links
 

1973 births
Living people
Turkmenistan long jumpers
Athletes (track and field) at the 1996 Summer Olympics
Olympic athletes of Turkmenistan
Russian male long jumpers
Athletes (track and field) at the 2000 Summer Olympics
Athletes (track and field) at the 2008 Summer Olympics
Olympic athletes of Russia
Turkmenistan people of Russian descent
Sportspeople from Ashgabat
Turkmenistan sportsmen
World Athletics Championships athletes for Turkmenistan